The Men's 56 kg event at the 2010 South American Games was held over March 26 at 16:00. Since there were only three athletes in the competition, no bronze medal was awarded.

Medalists

Results

References
Final

56kg M